UFC 216: Ferguson vs. Lee was a mixed martial arts event produced by the Ultimate Fighting Championship held on October 7, 2017 at T-Mobile Arena in Paradise, Nevada, part of the Las Vegas metropolitan area.

Background
A UFC Heavyweight Championship bout between former UFC Heavyweight champions Stipe Miocic and Cain Velasquez was initially targeted to headline this event. After that pairing failed to materialize, the promotion announced plans for an interim UFC Lightweight Championship bout between The Ultimate Fighter: Team Lesnar vs. Team dos Santos welterweight winner Tony Ferguson and Kevin Lee to serve as the main event.

A UFC Flyweight Championship bout between former Flyweight champion Demetrious Johnson and Ray Borg was expected to headline UFC 215. However, the fight was canceled a day before the event, as Borg was forced to withdraw from the fight due to illness. His illness was unrelated to his weight cut, sources say. The fight was later rescheduled for this event. If successful, Johnson would have the all-time most consecutive UFC title defenses in any division, with eleven.

Abel Trujillo was expected to face Lando Vannata at the event. However, Trujillo was removed from the card on August 14 for undisclosed reasons and was replaced by Bobby Green.

Paige VanZant was expected to face Jessica Eye at the event. However, VanZant pulled out of the fight on September 25 citing a back injury. Subsequently, Eye was pulled from the card and is expected to be rescheduled against a different opponent at a future event.

A women's flyweight bout between promotional newcomers Andrea Lee and Kalindra Faria was expected to be a late addition to this event, as it was announced on September 28. However a few hours later, it was revealed that Lee was pulled from the contest as she didn't go through the USADA testing pool for six months. Usually short notice fights do not need to follow such rule, but since she has failed a drug test in the past, Lee must fulfill that requirement. She was replaced by fellow promotional newcomer Mara Romero Borella.

A lightweight bout between Nik Lentz and former Bellator Lightweight Champion Will Brooks was slated for the preliminary portion of the card. However the pairing was scrapped during the weigh-ins for the event, as Lentz was stricken with "medical issues" and deemed unfit to compete.

A heavyweight bout between former heavyweight champion Fabrício Werdum and Derrick Lewis was slated for the main card. However, the fight was scrapped the day of the event when Lewis couldn't move due to back pain from a previous back injury. As a result, Walt Harris, who was originally scheduled to face Mark Godbeer in a preliminary bout, was tabbed as a short-notice opponent for Werdum.

Results

Bonus awards
The following fighters were awarded $50,000 bonuses:
Fight of the Night: Lando Vannata vs. Bobby Green 
Performance of the Night: Demetrious Johnson and John Moraga

Reported payout
The following is the reported payout to the fighters as reported to the Nevada State Athletic Commission. It does not include sponsor money and also does not include the UFC's traditional "fight night" bonuses. The total disclosed payout for the event was $2,178,000. 
 Tony Ferguson: $500,000 (includes $250,000 win bonus) def. Kevin Lee: $250,000
 Demetrious Johnson: $370,000 (no win bonus) def. Ray Borg: $100,000
 Fabrício Werdum: $400,000 (includes $125,000 win bonus) def. Walt Harris: $28,000
 Mara Romero Borella: $24,000 (includes $12,000 win bonus) def. Kalindra Faria: $12,000
 Beneil Dariush: $48,000 drew with Evan Dunham: $40,000
 Cody Stamann: $24,000 (includes $12,000 win bonus) def. Tom Duquesnoy: $23,000
 Lando Vannata: $25,000 drew with Bobby Green: $24,000
 Poliana Botelho: $20,000 (includes $10,000 win bonus) def. Pearl Gonzalez: $10,000
 Matt Schnell: $20,000 (includes $10,000 win bonus) def. Marco Beltrán: $14,000
 John Moraga: $68,000 (includes $34,000 win bonus) def. Magomed Bibulatov: $17,000
 Brad Tavares: $74,000 (includes $37,000 win bonus) def. Thales Leites: $57,000

Although not included on the NSAC's initial report, Mark Godbeer ($15,000/$15,000) was paid his show purse and a win bonus after he was removed from his scheduled bout with Walt Harris on the day of the event.

Records set
With his win, Johnson broke Anderson Silva's record for most consecutive title defenses (11).

See also
List of UFC events
2017 in UFC

References

Ultimate Fighting Championship events
Events in Paradise, Nevada
2017 in mixed martial arts
Mixed martial arts in Las Vegas
2017 in sports in Nevada
October 2017 sports events in the United States